Jens Adler (born 25 April 1965) is a German former footballer who played as a goalkeeper.

His sole international appearance came for East Germany in the national team's last match on 12 September 1990. He came on to replace Jens Schmidt as a late substitute in a 2–0 away win over Belgium, although he never touched the ball. As a result, he became the last man to win a cap for East Germany.

Adler played for Hallescher FC for eleven seasons, either side of German reunification. In 1995, he moved to Hertha BSC, but played very little, where his only senior appearance saw him come on as a substitute for Christian Fiedler in a match against KFC Uerdingen 05. After two seasons he returned to Halle, this time to sign for VfL Halle 1896. He retired from football in 2000 and returned to Hallescher FC to serve as goalkeeper coach.

Notes

References

External links 
 
 
 

1965 births
Living people
Sportspeople from Halle (Saale)
People from Bezirk Halle
German footballers
East German footballers
Footballers from Saxony-Anhalt
East Germany international footballers
Hallescher FC players
Hertha BSC players
VfL Halle 1896 players
2. Bundesliga players
DDR-Oberliga players
Association football goalkeepers